Ghost sickness is a cultural belief among some traditional indigenous peoples in North America, notably the Navajo, and some Muscogee and Plains cultures, as well as among Polynesian peoples. People who are preoccupied and/or consumed by the deceased are believed to suffer from ghost sickness. Reported symptoms can include general weakness, loss of appetite, suffocation feelings, recurring nightmares, and a pervasive feeling of terror. The sickness is attributed to ghosts or, occasionally, to witches or witchcraft.

Cultural background
In the Muscogee (Creek) culture, it is believed that everyone is a part of an energy called Ibofanga. This energy supposedly results from the flow between mind, body, and spirit. Illness can result from this flow being disrupted. Therefore, their "medicine is used to prevent or treat an obstruction and restore the peaceful flow of energy within a person". Purification rituals for mourning "focus on preventing unnatural or prolonged emotional and physical drain."

The traditional Native American grief resolution process is qualitatively different from those usually seen in mainstream Western cultures. In 1881, there was a federal ban on some of the traditional mourning rituals practised by the Lakota and other tribes. Lakota expert Maria Yellow Horse Brave Heart proposes that the loss of these rituals may have caused the Lakota to be "further predisposed to the development of pathological grief". Some manifestations of unresolved grief include seeking visions of the spirits of deceased relatives, obsessive reminiscing about the deceased, longing for and believing in a reunion with the deceased, fantasies of reappearance of the deceased, and belief in one's ability to project oneself to the past or to the future.

Cause
There are a variety of mainstream psychological theories about Ghost Sickness. Putsch states that "Spirits or 'ghosts' may be viewed as being directly or indirectly linked to the cause of an event, accident, or illness". retrieved on May 22, 2008 Both Erikson and Macgregor report substantiating evidence of psychological trauma response in ghost sickness, with features including withdrawal and psychic numbing, anxiety and hypervigilance, guilt, identification with ancestral pain and death, and chronic sadness and depression.

Treatment
Religious leaders within the Navajo tribe repeatedly perform ceremonies to eliminate the all-consuming thoughts of the dead.

See also 

 Complicated grief disorder
 Vengeful ghost

References

Sickness
Native American religion
Navajo mythology
Psychosis
American witchcraft
Native American health
Grief
Culture-bound syndromes
Polynesian mythology